This is a list of schools in Brighton and Hove, in the English county of East Sussex.

State-funded schools

Primary schools

 Aldrington CE Primary School, Hove
 Balfour Primary School, Brighton
 Benfield Primary School, Portslade
 Bevendean Primary School, Bevendean
 Bilingual Primary School, Hove
 Brackenbury Primary School, Portslade
 Brunswick Primary School, Hove
 Carden Primary School, Brighton
 Carlton Hill Primary School, Brighton
 City Academy Whitehawk, Whitehawk
 Coldean Primary School, Coldean
 Coombe Road Primary School, Brighton
 Cottesmore St Mary's RC Primary School, Hove
 Downs Infant School, Brighton
 Downs Junior School, Brighton
 Elm Grove Primary School, Brighton
 Fairlight Primary School, Brighton
 Goldstone Primary School, Hove
 Hangleton Primary School, Hove
 Hertford Infant and Nursery School, Brighton
 Hertford Junior School, Brighton
 Hove Junior School, Hove
 Middle Street Primary School, Brighton
 Mile Oak Primary School, Portslade
 Moulsecoomb Primary School, Moulsecoomb
 Our Lady of Lourdes RC Primary School Rottingdean
 Patcham Infant School, Patcham
 Patcham Junior School, Patcham
 Peter Gladwin Primary School, Portslade
 Queen's Park Primary School, Brighton
 Rudyard Kipling Primary School & Nursery, Woodingdean
 St Andrew's CE Primary School, Hove
 St Bartholomew's CE Primary School, Brighton
 St Bernadette's RC Primary School, Withdean
 St John The Baptist RC Primary School, Brighton
 St Joseph's RC Primary School, Hollingdean
 St Luke's Primary School, Brighton
 St Margaret's CE Primary School, Rottingdean
 St Mark's CE Primary School, Brighton
 St Martin's CE Primary School, Brighton
 St Mary Magdalen's RC Primary School Brighton
 St Mary's RC Primary School, Portslade
 St Nicholas' CE Primary School, Portslade
 St Paul's CE Primary School, Brighton
 St Peter's Community Primary School, Portslade
 Saltdean Primary School, Saltdean
 Stanford Infant School, Brighton
 Stanford Junior School, Brighton
 West Blatchington Primary and Nursery School, West Blatchington
 West Hove Infant School, Hove
 Westdene Primary School, Brighton
 Woodingdean Primary School, Woodingdean

Secondary schools

 Blatchington Mill School and Sixth Form College, West Blatchington
 Brighton Aldridge Community Academy, Brighton
 Cardinal Newman Catholic School, Hove
 Dorothy Stringer School, Brighton
 Hove Park School, Hove
 King's School, Hove
 Longhill High School, Rottingdean
 Patcham High School, Patcham
 Portslade Aldridge Community Academy, Portslade
 Varndean School, Brighton

Special and alternative schools
 Central Hub Brighton, Brighton
 Downs View Special School, Woodingdean
 Hill Park School, Portslade
 Homewood College, Brighton

Further education
 Brighton Hove & Sussex Sixth Form College (BHASVIC), Hove
 Varndean College, Brighton
 City College Brighton & Hove, Brighton

Independent schools

Primary and preparatory schools
 Brighton and Hove Montessori School, Brighton
 Brighton College Nursery and Pre-Prep School, Brighton
 Brighton College Preparatory School, Brighton
 Lancing College Preparatory School, Hove
 The Montessori Place, Hove
 St Christopher's School, Hove
 Windlesham School, Brighton

Senior and all-through schools

 Bartholomews Tutorial College, Brighton
 Bellerbys College, Brighton
 Brighton College, Brighton
 Brighton Girls, Brighton, Brighton
 Brighton International School, Brighton
 Brighton Waldorf School, Brighton
 The Drive Prep School, Hove
 Kings Brighton, Brighton
 Oxford International College, Brighton
 Roedean School, Roedean

Special and alternative schools
 Brighton and Hove Clinic School, Hove
 Hamilton Lodge School for Deaf Children, Brighton
 The Lioncare School, Hove

Further education
 Hove College, Hove

See also
List of former board schools in Brighton and Hove

References

Brighton and Hove
Schools in Brighton and Hove
Schools
Lists of buildings and structures in East Sussex